Pleasant Unity is an unincorporated community in a rural section of Unity Township, Westmoreland County, Pennsylvania, United States.

Pleasant Unity has a post office, with ZIP code 15676, which opened on November 2, 1825. The area covered by this zip code has a population of 437.

The Jamison Coal and Coke Company operated an underground bituminous coal mine near Pleasant Unity during the period from 1918 through the early 1960s. Known as Jamison No. 20, the mining complex was off Route 981, three miles north of the town. The company store was located on Route 981 at Phillips Street. The mine was served by the Unity Branch of the Pennsylvania Railroad. By 1940, it employed approximately 300 miners.

See also
 Library of Congress. Photos, Prints and Drawings of Pleasant Unity, PA.
 Pennsylvania State University. Pennsvylvania Mine Map Atlas,

References

Unincorporated communities in Westmoreland County, Pennsylvania
Unincorporated communities in Pennsylvania